Events from the year 1319 in the Kingdom of Scotland.

Incumbents
Monarch – Robert I

Events
 20 September – Battle of Myton: major engagement in the First Scottish War of Independence, fought in Yorkshire results in victory for Scots.
 29 December – two-year truce with England, agreed several days earlier, comes into effect

See also

 Timeline of Scottish history

References

 
Years of the 14th century in Scotland
Wars of Scottish Independence